Žiemelis is a Lithuanian masculine name. Its feminine forms are Žiemelienė (married woman) and Žiemelytė (maiden name). Notable people with the surname include:

Aleksandrs Žiemelis known as Sasha Siemel (born 1890), Latvian adventurer and jaguar hunter
Gediminas Žiemelis (born 1977), Lithuanian businessman
Vidmantas Žiemelis (born 1950), Lithuanian politician

Lithuanian-language surnames